Zielęcin  is a village in the administrative district of Gmina Warta, within Sieradz County, Łódź Voivodeship, in central Poland.

The village has a population of 130.

References

Villages in Sieradz County